James Cowan (28 September 1856 – 7 August 1943) was a British sports shooter. He competed in two events at the 1908 Summer Olympics.

References

1856 births
1943 deaths
British male sport shooters
Olympic shooters of Great Britain
Shooters at the 1908 Summer Olympics
People from Brentford
Sportspeople from London